Sudenfeld is a small village in Germany. It is located south of Osnabrück.

References

External links
 Osnanet.de

Villages in Lower Saxony